Adolph of Sweden - Swedish: Adolf and Alf - may refer to:

Adolph, legendary Swea king better known as Alf
Adolph Frederick (1710–1771), King of Sweden 1751–1771
Alf Johansson, Swedish prince 12th century, buried at Vreta Abbey
Adolph John I, Count Palatine of Kleeburg (1629–1689), Prince of Sweden from 1654
A number of Swedish kings and Swedish princes who had Adolph as a secondary name